Novgorod Yurievo Airport  is a former airport serving the city of Velikiy Novgorod, Novgorod Oblast, Russia, located  southwest of the city centre. It was officially closed and replaced by the Krechevitsy Airport in 2002. It was a busy airport during the Soviet era, with regular flights to Minsk, Moscow, Krasnodar and other destinations. After the fall of the Soviet Union in 1991, the airport became abandoned due to economic stagnation. In 1996, the airport was hosting only one regular daily flight to Moscow, but these flights were cancelled soon afterwards due to a small numbers of travellers deterred by high ticket prices.

As of 2006, the only purpose Novgorod Airport serves is hosting a meteorological facility, still operational and providing weather forecasts for the city. The former runway is used for car racing.

Defunct airports
Airports built in the Soviet Union
Airports in Novgorod Oblast
Buildings and structures in Veliky Novgorod